Admiral Tributs is a Project 1155 Large Anti-Submarine Ship (BPK) of the Russian Navy. Launched in 1983, Admiral Tributs serves in the Russian Pacific Fleet, and has taken part in operations alongside the naval forces of other nations like China, India and Japan, and as part of a peacekeeping force in the Middle East between 1992 and 1993.

Design
Admiral Tributs is the sixth ship of a class of twelve Project 1155 Fregat (also known as the Udaloy-class). The vessel is designated as a Large Anti-Submarine Ship (BPK) in accordance with its primary mission of countering submarines and a destroyer by NATO.

Displacement was  standard and  full load.

Armament
To combat submarines, Admiral Tributs mounts two quadruple launchers for eight missiles in the Metel Anti-Ship Complex along with two RBU-6000 12-barrel rocket launchers for close in defence. The ship is also equipped with two quadruple  CHTA-53-1155 torpedo tubes for 53-65K, SET-65 torpedoes. A hangar aft accommodates two Kamov Ka-27 helicopters for anti-submarine warfare. Protection from aircraft was provided with eight 3K95 Kinzhal missiles mounted in vertical launchers supplemented by  AK-100 DP guns and four  AK-630 Gatling guns.

Electronic warfare
The vessel is equipped with the MR-760 Fregat-MA (NATO reporting name 'Top Plate') air/surface search, MR-320V Topaz-V ('Strut Pair') air/surface search and MR-212/201-1 Vaygach-U navigation radars along with MR-350 Podkat ('Cross Sword') and K-12-1 ('Hot Flash') fire control radars. The MGK-355 Polinom sonar complex (combining 'Horse Jaw' bow mounted and 'Horse Tail' variable depth sonars) is complemented by two MG-7 Braslet anti-saboteur sonars and the MG-35 Shtil-2 underwater communication system.

Service
Admiral Tributs was laid down on 19 April 1980 and launched on 26 March 1983. The ship is named after Vladimir Filippovich Tributs.

She was accepted into the Pacific Fleet on 15 February 1986 and attached to the 183rd Anti-Submarine Warfare Brigade. The ship served in the Indian Ocean in 1987, visiting Aden, South Yemen, and 1990, visiting Penang, Malaysia. Between 5 December 1992 and 23 May 1993, the vessel undertook peacekeeping duties in the Persian Gulf, followed by a lengthy modernisation at Dalzavod, Vladivostok that lasted from March 1994 to March 2003.

Resuming service, between 10 and 15 February 2004, Admiral Tributs joined Varyag on a visit to Incheon, South Korea, to celebrate the centenary of the battle between Varyag and the Japanese fleet during the Battle of Chemulpo Bay.  In 2005, the vessel took part in joint exercises with India, visited Tanjung Priok, Indonesia, Singapore. Sattahip, Thailand, Danang, Vietnam, Victoria, Seychelles and Klang, Malaysia, took part in exercises with Moskva and Pyotr Velikiy and joint exercises with the Japan Maritime Self-Defense Force alongside Admiral Panteleyev. Following a visit to Ho Chi Minh City, Vietnam, in April 2012, the vessel joined sisterships Admiral Vinogradov and Marshal Shaposhnikov for joint exercises with the People's Liberation Army Navy.

2021

In February 2021, the ship conducted exercises in the Sea of Japan.

In late December 2021, Admiral Tributs, along with cruiser Varyag, left Vladivostok for a long deployment, consisting of port calls in several countries. On 11 January 2022, the warships entered the Indian Ocean, and called at Kochi on 14 January 2022.

2022

In February 2022, in the context of the Russian invasion of Ukraine, Admiral Tributs entered the Mediterranean Sea, along with cruiser Varyag and tanker Boris Butoma, joining the Permanent task force of the Russian Navy in the Mediterranean Sea. In July 2022, Admiral Tributs, Varyag and intelligence ship Vasily Tatishchev became the first Russian Navy's ships operating in the Adriatic Sea since 1995 Volk's deployment amid US bombardment of Bosnia and Herzegovina. In late July, destroyer Admiral Tributs operated off Šibenik, intelligence ship Vasily Tatishchev operated near island Palagruža, cruiser Varyag operated near Durres, while frigate  remained just outside the Adriatic Sea. As the US carrier Truman was located in the Adriatic Sea at the same time, there were reports in media about Russian warships simulating blocking the US carrier in the Adriatic Sea.

In October 2022, Admiral Tributs, Varyag and Boris Butoma departed the Mediterranean via the Suez canal, returning to Vladivostok on 18 November.

Pennant numbers

Gallery

References

Citations

Bibliography

 
 
 
 
 

1983 ships
Udaloy-class destroyers
Cold War destroyers of the Soviet Union
Destroyers of the Russian Navy
Ships built at Severnaya Verf